Eric Lohr is the chair of the department of history at American University.

Works

References

Living people
American University faculty and staff
Historians of Russia
Year of birth missing (living people)